Kaibab (from a Native American word meaning "mountain lying down") may refer to the following (all in the Southwestern United States):

 Kaibab, Arizona, a small community
 Kaibab Indian Reservation, Arizona
 Kaibab National Forest, Arizona
 Kaibab Limestone, Arizona, Utah, Nevada, and California
 Kaibab Plateau, Arizona and Utah
 Kaibab squirrel, found on the Kaibab Plateau
 North Kaibab Trail, Grand Canyon National Park, Arizona
 South Kaibab Trail, Grand Canyon National Park, Arizona
 Kaibab Plateau-North Rim Parkway (Arizona State Route 67)